Hyptianthera is a genus of flowering plants belonging to the family Rubiaceae.

Its native range is Himalaya to Southern Central China and Indo-China.

Species:
 Hyptianthera stricta (Roxb. ex Schult.) Wight & Arn.

References

Rubiaceae
Rubiaceae genera